KP Namboodiris is an ayurvedic medicine manufacturing company situated in Thrissur City of Kerala State in India. It also has an interest in personal care and health care products. 
The company was started in 1925 by its founder K.P. Namboodiri (Kolathappilly Pothayan Namboothiri) in Thrissur. The company has a research & development department.

References

Ayurvedic companies
Health care companies of India
Health care companies established in 1925
Pharmaceutical companies of Thrissur
Ayurveda in Kerala
Indian companies established in 1925